The 2009 Africa Trophy was the first edition of rugby union intermediate African championship for national teams.

North Zone 

The tournament was played in Safi, Morocco.

Semifinals

3rd-4th place payoff

Final

South Zone 

The tournament was played in Gaborone, Botswana. It was also of the first two of division one of south section of 2008 CAR Development Trophy.

References 
 CAR rugby news brochure 1
 African Championship espnscrum.com

Africa Cup
Africa Trophy
Trophy